Memphis was converted from a floating drydock in 1861 at New Orleans. In November 1861, she was "under construction or alteration" and in December was noted as having been at New Orleans "without any armament." By February 1862, Memphis was evidently fitted out, as she was noted as being one of the units of Flag Officer George N. Hollins, who commanded the naval defenses of the Mississippi and the coast of Louisiana.

The records are naturally skimpy on a unit of such small size. The battery, however, can be surmised to have been one of those that took part in the defense of New Orleans, and was probably destroyed or captured when Farragut's fleet captured the city.

References 

Ships of the Confederate States Navy
1861 ships